Batu Caves Murugan Statue (Tamil: முருகன் சிலை; Bahasa Malaysia: Tugu Dewa Murugga),  is the tallest statue of a Hindu deity in Malaysia and one of the tallest statue in the world, It is also the tallest statue in Malaysia at  in height.

The statue of Murugan was built by Tamil Malaysians. It took three years to construct, and was unveiled in January 2006 during Thaipusam festival. The managing authority of the temple rests with the Tamil descendants. Inspired by this statue, 146 ft tall Muthumalai Murugan Statue was sculpted in Salem district of Tamil Nadu in 2022.

Every year, thousands of devotees from Tamil Nadu & Sri Lanka visit this temple to pay their tributes to the deity at the auspicious day of Thaipusam according to the Tamil Calendar. It is located at the Sri Murugan Perumal Kovil at the foot of Batu Caves.

Construction
 2.5 Mil Ringgit Malaysia was spent to build this statue
 350 tons of Steel bars, 1,550 cubic metres of Concrete, and 300 litres of gold paint used to build this statue
 15 sculptors from India

References

 

Colossal statues
Religious buildings and structures in Selangor
Monuments and memorials in Malaysia